Andres Heinapuu (born 16 March 1954 Tallinn) is an Estonian bibliographer and politician. He was a member of VII Riigikogu. He is active in the Estonian neopagan organisation Maavalla Koda.

References

Living people
1954 births
Members of the Riigikogu, 1992–1995
Recipients of the Order of the White Star, 4th Class
University of Tartu alumni
Politicians from Tallinn
Estonian modern pagans